Cryptenamine (Unitensen) is a mixture of 10 hypotensive alkaloids extracted from Veratrum album (protoveratrines A and B; germitrine, neogermitrine, germerine, and germidine; jervine, rubijervine, and isorubijervine; and germbudine). It is used in the treatment of hypertension.

References 

Antihypertensive agents
Quinolizidine alkaloids